The Royal Karlskrona Admiralty Parish in Karlskrona, Sweden, is a non-territorial Lutheran parish for navy personnel and their families, which has existed in Karlskrona since 1685. Its church is the wooden "Admiralty Church" (Ulrica Pia) built in 1685, located close to the naval shipyard area. There was also an "Admiralty Parish" in Stockholm on Skeppsholmen between 1672 and 1970.

References
Nationalencyklopedin 1989

Parishes of the Church of Sweden
Karlskrona